Jesse Davis (born September 11, 1965) is an American jazz saxophonist. He began as a student in Ellis Marsalis's New Orleans Center for Creative Arts. After graduating, Davis embarked on a productive jazz career, recording eight albums on the Concord Jazz label, alongside collaborations with such artists as Jack McDuff and Illinois Jacquet. Davis has studied music at Northeastern Illinois University, and in 1989 he received a "Most Outstanding Musician award" from Down Beat magazine.

Discography
Horn of Passion (Concord, 1991) with Mulgrew Miller
 As We Speak (Concord, 1992) with Jacky Terrasson, Robert Trowers
 Young at Art (Concord, 1993) with Brad Mehldau
 High Standards (Concord, 1994) with Nicholas Payton, Dado Moroni, Peter Washington
From Within (Concord, 1996) with Nicholas Payton, Hank Jones, Ron Carter, Lewis Nash
First Insight (Concord, 1997) with Mulgrew Miller, Peter Bernstein, Ron Carter, Kenny Washington
The Set-Up (All Tribe, 2002) with Peter Bernstein, Ray Drummond
With Cedar Walton
As Long as There's Music (Muse, 1990 [1993])
With Gerald Wilson
New York, New Sound (Mack Avenue, 2003)

Notes 

American jazz saxophonists
American male saxophonists
African-American saxophonists
Mainstream jazz saxophonists
Hard bop saxophonists
Northeastern Illinois University alumni
1965 births
Living people
21st-century American saxophonists
21st-century American male musicians
American male jazz musicians
21st-century African-American musicians
20th-century African-American people